Gerardo Mirad (born 25 August 1967) is an Argentine former professional tennis player.

Mirad, who comes from Rosario, started playing tennis at the age of seven and turned professional in 1986. He reached a best singles ranking of 266 in the world and made the second round at the 1989 Campionati Internazionali di Sicilia. In doubles he was a losing finalist at the 1989 Athens Open, partnering Gustavo Giussani.

Grand Prix career finals

Doubles: 1 (0–1)

Challenger titles

Doubles: (2)

References

External links
 
 

1967 births
Living people
Argentine male tennis players
Sportspeople from Rosario, Santa Fe